Tämän maailman ruhtinaan hovi (2004) (transl. Court of the prince of this world) is an album by the Finnish thrash metal group Mokoma.

Track listing
 "Toista maata" - 4.31 "Other kind"
 "Haudan takaa" - 3.21 "From beyond the grave"
 "Hiljaisuuden julistaja" - 2.27 "Proclaimer of silence"
 "Tämän maailman ruhtinaan hovi" - 4.16 "Court of the prince of this world"
 "Minä elän!" - 3.35 "I Live!"
 "Kiellän itseni" - 2.56 "I deny myself"
 "Hyinen syli" - 4.18 "A frigid lap"
 "Vade retro, Satana!" - 2.34 
 "Sudet ihmisten vaatteissa" - 4.10 "Wolves in human clothes"
 "Poltetun maan taktiikkaa" - 3.10 "Scorched earth tactics"
 "Nämä kolme ovat yhtä" - 2.43 "These three are one"
 "Uni saa tulla" - 3.24 "Sleep may come"

Personnel
 Marko Annala - vocals
 Kuisma Aalto - guitar, bass guitar, backing vocals
 Tuomo Saikkonen - guitar, bass guitar, backing vocals
 Janne Hyrkäs - drums

Mokoma albums
2004 albums